Alison Powers is an American former racing cyclist who last rode for the UnitedHealthcare Women’s Team.

Powers is the first American rider to simultaneously be National Champion in all three disciplines of road cycling (Criterium, Road and Time trial).

On October 23, 2014, Powers announced her retirement from the sport.

Palmares
Source:

2006
1st Stage 4 Tour of the Gila
1st Prologue & Stage 5 Mount Hood Classic
1st Stage 1 Tour de Toona
2007
1st  National Time Trial Championships
1st  Pan American Time Trial Championships
1st Sequoia Cycling Classic
1st Stage 2 Tour de Toona
2nd National Track Championships (individual pursuit)
2nd National Track Championships (points race)
3rd Memorial Davide Fardelli Chrono
2009
1st Overall Joe Martin Stage Race
1st Stages 1 & 4
1st Boulder Criterium
2nd Overall Tour of the Gila
6th Liberty Classic
3rd Overall Redlands Bicycle Classic
1st Stage 3
3rd Overall Nature Valley Grand Prix
3rd National Time Trial Championships
2010
1st Overall Joe Martin Stage Race
1st Prologue Cascade Cycling Classic
2012
3rd National Time Trial Championships
3rd Las Vegas Cyclo-cross
2013
1st  National Criterium Championships
3rd National Road Race Championships
3rd National Time Trial Championships
2014
1st  National Time Trial Championships
1st  National Road Race Championships
1st  Overall Tour Femenino de San Luis
1st  Combination classification
1st Stage 3
1st Stage 4 Tour of the Gila
1st Women's Tour of California Time Trial

References

American female cyclists
Living people
1979 births
American female alpine skiers
21st-century American women